The Revolution of Pigs is a 2004 Estonian comedy film that was a feature film debut for two young Estonian directors René Reinumägi and Jaak Kilmi.  Fueled by a great soundtrack of classic ‘80s pop, the revolution is brewing. Set in the summer of 1986, hundreds of teenagers have gathered in the woods for Estonian student summer camp—three days full of adventures, falling in love and partying. But, when the teens are forced to comply with rules of proper behavior, camp in a totalitarian system is not all it is cracked up to be. The political metaphor of the counselors’ control leads to an uprising of the students. The main character is 16-year-old Tanel, who initially is as focused on losing his virginity and getting drunk as overthrowing the system. But taking part in the revolt, he discovers himself.

Cast
Jass Seljamaa - Tanel
Evelin Kuusik - Diana
Lilian Alto - Päike
Uku Uusberg - Urmas
Vadim Albrant - Futu
Mikk Tammepõld- Erki
Merle Liivak - Mariann
Merli Rosar - Juta
Tarvo Kaspar Toome - Punk rocker Timo
Martin Mill - Ats
Anu Saagim - Meierei
Peeter Tammearu - Erki's father
Tõnu Tepandi - Komandör
Tõnu Oja - Operator
Anne Paluver - Staabi mutt
Arvo Kukumägi - Vuntsidega Komandör
Üllar Saaremäe - Commander of Hundissaare

References

External links
 

Films set in Estonia
2004 films
2004 comedy films
Films about virginity
Films shot in Estonia
Films about summer camps
Estonian comedy films
Estonian-language films